Abubakirovo (Äbübäker) is a rural locality (a village) in Fyodorovsky Selsoviet of Khaybullinsky District, Bashkortostan, Russia. The population was 640 . There are 7 streets.

Geography 
Abubakirovo is located 21 km west of Akyar (the district's administrative centre) by road. Antingan is the nearest rural locality.

Ethnicity 
The village is inhabited by Bashkirs.

References 

Rural localities in Khaybullinsky District